The 1997–98 Northern Counties East Football League season was the 16th in the history of Northern Counties East Football League, a football competition in England.

Premier Division

The Premier Division featured 18 clubs which competed in the previous season, along with two new clubs:
Curzon Ashton, relegated from the Northern Premier League
Eccleshill United, promoted from Division One

League table

Division One

Division One featured 14 clubs which competed in the previous season, along with one new club:
Staveley Miners Welfare, joined from the Central Midlands League

League table

External links
 Northern Counties East Football League

1997–98
8